Lieutenant-General Sir Ernest Edward Down KBE CB (1902–1980) was a senior officer of the British Army, who saw active service during the Second World War.

Military career
Ernest Down was commissioned as a second lieutenant into the Dorset Regiment in February 1923.

He served in the Second World War, attending a short course at the Staff College, Camberley in 1940, being appointed commander of the 2nd Parachute Brigade, then serving in North Africa in 1942. He went on to be General Officer Commanding (GOC) 1st Airborne Division, taking over from Major-General George Hopkinson who had been killed in action, in September 1943, in the early stages of the Allied invasion of Italy. He was then GOC of 9th Indian Airborne Division which itself became the 44th Indian Airborne Division in 1944 and GOC of 2nd Indian Airborne Division in 1945.

After the war, on 26 September 1946, Down was appointed GOC of 4th Infantry Division in Greece. In 1947, after the division had been disbanded, he became GOC of all British Troops in Greece. Then in 1948, he became head of the British Military Mission to Greece. Returning to the United Kingdom he was appointed District Officer Commanding Mid-West District and GOC 53rd (Welsh) Infantry Division in 1950 and GOC-in Chief of Southern Command in 1952, a post from which he retired in 1955.

He was also Colonel of the King's Shropshire Light Infantry from 1955 to 1957.

References

Bibliography

External links
Biography of Lieutenant General Sir Ernest Edward Down
Generals of World War II

|-

|-

|-
 

|-

 

1902 births
1980 deaths
Graduates of the Staff College, Camberley
Military personnel from Cornwall
British Army generals of World War II
Knights Commander of the Order of the British Empire
Companions of the Order of the Bath
Dorset Regiment officers
British Army lieutenant generals
Graduates of the Royal Military College, Sandhurst